Hermann Greß (born 16 December 1954) is a German rower. He competed in the men's coxed pair event at the 1984 Summer Olympics.

References

External links
 

1954 births
Living people
German male rowers
Olympic rowers of West Germany
Rowers at the 1984 Summer Olympics
Sportspeople from Würzburg